Phansu is a village in the Ratnagiri district of Maharashtra, in the Dapoli taluka. It is a rural town located in the Konkan division. The 2011 Census of India recorded a total of 1,069 residents in the village.

Phansu is named after the jackfruit tree, called "phanas."  It is the ancestral land of the Pethes.  The Pethes are a Chitpavan family.

Phansu has a school, several stores, and a Hanuman temple.

References

Villages in Ratnagiri district